Andrew Seagle Farm is a historic home and farm located near Reepsville, Lincoln County, North Carolina.  The farmhouse was built in two sections, each two stories, three-bays wide, with the oldest dating to 1860. It has a full-width shed roofed front porch. Also located on the property are the contributing log barn, smokehouse, and storage buildings and a dome shaped stuccoed brick "bake oven."

It was listed on the National Register of Historic Places in 1975.

References

Farms on the National Register of Historic Places in North Carolina
Houses completed in 1860
Buildings and structures in Lincoln County, North Carolina
National Register of Historic Places in Lincoln County, North Carolina